The Dr. Granville Wood House is a historic house in Mimbres, New Mexico. It was built in the early 1880s for Granville Wood, a physician and homesteader. It was designed in the Vernacular New Mexico architectural style. It has been listed on the National Register of Historic Places since May 16, 1988.

The house is adjacent to the Otto Huechling House, another listed house.

It was listed on the National Register as part of a 1988 study of historic resources in the Mimbres Valley of Grant County.

References

Houses on the National Register of Historic Places in New Mexico
National Register of Historic Places in Grant County, New Mexico